The ABU TV Song Festival is an annual non-competitive gala that showcases songs or instrumentals by musicians across Asia, organised by the Asia-Pacific Broadcasting Union (ABU). Participating countries which have full or additional full ABU membership are invited to submit a song to be performed in front of a live audience. It is live recorded so that each of the national broadcasters may add subtitles in their respective Asian languages.

In contrast to the Eurovision Song Contest in Europe, which has numerous rules and obligations as well as a voting system to determine a specific "winner", the television festival is a non-competitive, cordial musical gala presentation, with the intention to recognise the musical talent of Asian musicians across Asia.

Development
The Asia-Pacific Broadcasting Union (ABU) had already run an international song contest for its members inspired by the Eurovision Song Contest in 1985 – 1987, called the ABU Popular Song Contest, with 14 countries of the Asia-Pacific region competing. The show had a similar concept to the current radio song festival with winners being chosen by a professional jury. South Korea, New Zealand and Australia celebrated victories in this competition. In 1989 – 1991 ABU co-produced the ABU Golden Kite World Song Festival in Malaysia with participation of Asia-Pacific countries, as well as Yugoslavia and Finland.

Shortly before launching the ABU Song Festival, the ABU had been considering the possibility to organize the ABU ASEAN TV Song Festival in Thailand. Historically, ASEAN song contests had been organized in periods between 1981 and 1997, however since 2011 the ASEAN Festival had been organized between local Radio stations as Bintang Radio ASEAN.  The ABU outlined a plan about a "television song festival" based on the style of the Eurovision Song Contest following the cancellation of Our Sound. Kenny Kihyung Bae, chosen to the project manager, attended Eurovision Song Contest 2012 in Baku, Azerbaijan to learn more about the contest before putting it to work.

In November 2011, the ABU announced that they would organize its own TV and Radio Song Festivals to take place in Seoul, the South Korean capital, in time with 49th General Assembly in October 2012. The name Asiavision Song Contest was initially mentioned as a possibility, but they were later officially titled ABU TV Song Festival and ABU Radio Song Festival. According to the ABU, the deadline for participation applications for ABU TV Song Festival 2012 was 18 May 2012.

Format

The ABU TV Song Festival is a concert performance for professional musicians, who according to the organiser are well known in their country of origin. The event is not meant to be competitive. The festival will be recorded and is meant to be broadcast by participating ABU members first. Non-participating ABU members and non-ABU member broadcasters will be allowed to broadcast the festival for a fee at a later stage.  Every musician will be selected by a national broadcaster being member of the ABU. The participants perform during the general assembly of the ABU.

At a press conference held on 18 July 2013 it was announced that Indonesia were submitting a bid to host the ABU TV Song Festival 2015. In recent editions, the TV Festival has been held in the host city of the ABU General Assembly, with Istanbul, Turkey playing host to such assembly in 2015.  If the bid were to be successful it would be the first time that the TV Festival has taken place away from the host country of the General Assembly.

However, it was announced in August 2014 that Indonesia were making plans to host the ABU TV Song Festival 2016 instead.  Turkey's debut at the 2014 Festival has led to speculation that they are hosting the 2015 alongside the ABU General Assembly which was scheduled to take place in Istanbul.  It was further confirmed in October 2014 that Turkey were indeed the hosts of the 2015 festival, which is scheduled to take place in Istanbul sometime in October 2015.

Participation

Participation in the contest is open to members of the Asia-Pacific Broadcasting Union.
Table key

Hosting

See also 

 ABU Song Festivals
 ABU Radio Song Festival

Notes and references

Notes

References

External links 
 ABU Official website

Song contests
 
Asian music
2012 establishments in Asia
Music festivals established in 2012